Morad Sari (born June 20, 1973) is a French-Algerian kickboxer who is most well known for being the first non thai kickboxer to become a Lumpinee Boxing Stadium champion.

Titles and accomplishments

Muay Thai
 1998 ISKA Oriental rules World Welterweight Champion
 1999 Lumpinee Stadium Super lightweight (140 lbs) Champion
 2000 ISKA Oriental rules Intercontinental Super Welterweight Champion

Kickboxing
 2003 "Le Grand Tournoi" Tournament Winner

Fight record

|-  bgcolor="#cfc"
| 2008-02-23 || Win||align=left| Naim Dahou ||  Opération Muay Thai	||  France || Decision || 3 || 3:00
|-  bgcolor="#cfc"
| 2007-04-07 || Win||align=left|  Mohamed Bourkhis ||  La Nuit des Superfights VII|| Villebon, France || Decision || 3 || 3:00
|-  bgcolor="#fbb"
| 2007-03-24 || Loss||align=left| Dmitry Shakuta || It's Showtime Trophy 2007 || Lommel, Belgium || Decision || 3 || 3:00
|-
! style=background:white colspan=9 |
|-  bgcolor="#cfc"
| 2006-12-16 || Win||align=left| Youssef Akhnikh ||  La Nuit des Superfights V|| Villebon, France || Decision || 3 || 3:00
|- style="background:#cfc;"
| 2006-11-18 || Win||align=left| Samkor Kiatmontep ||  France vs Thaïlande || Levallois-Perret, France || Decision || 5 || 3:00
|-  style="background:#c5d2ea;"
| 2006-05-26 || Draw ||align=left| Buakaw Por.Pramuk ||  "Le Grand Tournoi" 2006 || Paris, France || Decision || 5 || 3:00
|-  bgcolor="#cfc"
| 2006- || Win||align=left| Matteo Sciacca ||  ||  Tours, France || KO (Left cross)|| 1 ||
|-  bgcolor="#cfc"
| 2006-03-02 || Win||align=left| Samranchai 96Peenang || France vs Thailande || Levallois Perret, France || Decision || 3 || 3:00
|-  bgcolor="#cfc"
| 2005-07-02 || Win||align=left| Wilfried Montagne ||  Le Grand Tournoi|| Paris, France || Decision || 3 || 3:00
|-  bgcolor="#fbb"
| 2005-05-09 || Loss ||align=left| Fouad Ezbiri ||  A1 - Lyon, Semi Final || Lyon, France || Decision || 3 || 3:00
|-  bgcolor="#cfc"
| 2005-05-09 || Win||align=left| Goran Borović ||  A1 - Lyon, Quarter Final || Lyon, France || Decision || 3 || 3:00
|-  bgcolor="#cfc"
| ? || Win ||align=left| Nachaturat ||  || Morocco || KO (Low kick)|| 1 ||
|-  bgcolor="#cfc"
| ? || Win ||align=left| Kevin Harper||  || France || Decision || 5 || 3:00
|-  bgcolor="#fbb"
| 2004-12-05 || Loss ||align=left|  Rambojiew Por.Tubtim || King's Birthday || Bangkok, Thailand || Decision || 3 || 3:00
|-  bgcolor="#cfc"
| 2004-06-05 || Win ||align=left| Stéphane Nikiéma || La Finale du Grand Tournoi || Paris, France || Decision ||  ||
|-  bgcolor="#cfc"
| 2004- || Win ||align=left| Vesko Doukic ||  || Banja Luka, Bosnia || Decision || 5 ||3:00
|-  style="background:#fbb;"
| 2003-11-12 || Loss ||align=left| Sakmongkol Sithchuchok ||  || Dubai, United Arab Emirates || Decision (Unanimous) || 12 || 2:00
|-  style="background:#cfc;"
| 2003-04-18 || Win ||align=left| Riad Rekhis ||Le Grand Tournoi, Final  || Paris, France || Decision  || 3 || 3:00
|-
! style=background:white colspan=9 |
|-  style="background:#cfc;"
| 2003-04-18 || Win ||align=left| Sakmongkol Sithchuchok ||Le Grand Tournoi, Semi Final  || Paris, France || Decision (Unanimous) || 3 || 3:00
|-  style="background:#cfc;"
| 2003-04-18 || Win ||align=left| Nuengtrakarn Por Muang Ubon ||Le Grand Tournoi, Quarter Final  || Paris, France || Decision (Unanimous) || 3 || 3:00
|-  bgcolor="#fbb"
| 2002-12-05 || Loss||align=left| Nuengtrakarn Por Muang Ubon ||King's Birthday  || Bangkok, Thailand || Decision ||5 || 3:00
|-  bgcolor="#fbb"
| 2002-07-06 || Loss||align=left| Nuengtrakarn Por Muang Ubon || Le Grand Tournoi, Semi Final || Paris, France || TKO || 2 ||
|-  bgcolor="#cfc"
| 2002-07-06 || Win||align=left| Dmitry Shakuta || Le Grand Tournoi, Quarter Final || Paris, France || Decision || 3 || 3:00
|-  bgcolor="#cfc"
| 2002-03-02 || Win||align=left|  Rani Berbachi || Le Grand Tournoi,  Final || Paris, France || Decision || 3 || 3:00
|-  bgcolor="#cfc"
| 2002-03-02 || Win||align=left| Goran Borovic || Le Grand Tournoi, Semi Final || Paris, France || Decision || 3 || 3:00
|-  bgcolor="#fbb"
| 2001-12-05 || Loss ||align=left|  Kengo Yamagami || King's Birthday || Bangkok, Thailand || Decision || 5||2:00
|-  bgcolor="#cfc"
| 2001-04-21 || Win ||align=left| Kaolan Kaovichit || Les Gladiateurs du Millenium || Paris France || Decision  || 8 || 2:00
|-  bgcolor="#fbb"
| 2000-11-01 || Loss||align=left| Masato || K-1 J-MAX 2000 || Tokyo, Japan || KO (Left hook) || 2 || 0:48 
|-
! style=background:white colspan=9 |
|-  bgcolor="#cfc"
| 2000- || Win||align=left| Orono Por Muang Ubon ||   || Las Vegas, USA || Decision  || 5 || 3:00
|-
! style=background:white colspan=9 |
|-  bgcolor="#fbb"
| 2000-05-13 || Loss||align=left| Jongsanan Fairtex || ISKA Muay Thai || San Jose, California, USA || Decision (Majority)  ||5 ||3:00 
|-
! style=background:white colspan=9 |
|-  bgcolor="#cfc"
| 2000-03-17 || Win ||align=left| Somkit Dermprakhon  || ISKA Muay Thai || Las Vegas, Nevada, USA || Decision (Unanimous)  ||5 ||3:00 
|-
! style=background:white colspan=9 |
|-  bgcolor="#fbb"
| 1999-12-05 || Loss||align=left| Orono Por Muang Ubon ||  King's Birthday || Bangkok, Thailand || Decision  || 5 || 3:00
|-  bgcolor="#cfc"
| 1999-05-08 || Win||align=left| Somchai Sor.Nantana || Lumpinee Stadium ||  Bangkok, Thailand ||KO (Punches)  ||5||
|-
! style=background:white colspan=9 |
|-  bgcolor="#cfc"
| 1999-02-27 || Win||align=left| Hector Pena ||  ||  Marseille, France || Decision (Unanimous)  ||5||3:00
|-  bgcolor="#cfc"
| 1998-12-05 || Win||align=left| Vihoknoi Chor.Malithong || King's Birthday ||  Bangkok, Thailand ||KO  ||||
|-  bgcolor="#cfc"
| 1998- || Win||align=left| Therdkiat Sitthepitak ||  ||  France ||TKO (Punches) ||3||
|-  bgcolor="#cfc"
| 1998-04-24 || Win||align=left| Den Muangsurin || Muay Thai "Night" || Thiais, France ||TKO (Punches) ||3||
|-
! style=background:white colspan=9 |
|-  bgcolor="#fbb"
| ? || Loss ||align=left| Towanlik|| Lumpinee Stadium || Bangkok, Thailand || Decision || 5||3:00
|-  bgcolor="#fbb"
| 1997-11-22 || Loss ||align=left| Saimai Chor Suananant|| Tournoi à 50 000 Dollars, Final || Le Cannet, France ||KO (Punches)||1||
|-  bgcolor="#cfc"
| 1997-11-22 || Win||align=left| Christian Garros|| Tournoi à 50 000 Dollars, Semi Final || Le Cannet, France || Ext.R Decision||4||3:00
|-  bgcolor="#cfc"
| 1997-11-22 || Win||align=left| François Pennachio|| Tournoi à 50 000 Dollars, Quarter Final || Le Cannet, France || Decision||3||3:00
|-  bgcolor="#fbb"
| 1997-10-25 || Loss ||align=left| Takashi Ito || MAJKF || Bunkyo, Tokyo, Japan || Decision (split) || 5 || 3:00
|-  bgcolor="#cfc"
| 1997- || Win||align=left| Saimai Chor Suananant||  || Gagny, France || Decision || 5||3:00 
|-
! style=background:white colspan=9 |
|-  bgcolor="#fbb"
| 1996- || Loss ||align=left| Saimai Chor Suananant|| France Thailand au Bataclan || Paris, France || Decision || 5||3:00 
|-
! style=background:white colspan=9 |
|-  bgcolor="#cfc"
| 1996-06-01 || Win ||align=left| Kader Marouf ||  || Paris, France || KO || 2||
|-  bgcolor="#cfc"
| ? || Win ||align=left| Bagjo Sor.Phanuch	|| Queen's Birthday || Thailand || KO   || ||
|-  bgcolor="#cfc"
| 1995- || Win ||align=left| Emmanuel N'toh ||  || France || Decision  || 5||3:00 
|-
|-  bgcolor="#cfc"
| 1995- || Win ||align=left|   || Rajadamnern Stadium || Bangkok, Thailand || KO || ||
|-  bgcolor="#cfc"
| 1995- || Win ||align=left| || Rajadamnern Stadium || Bangkok, Thailand || Decision || 5||3:00
|-  bgcolor="#cfc"
| 1995- || Win ||align=left| Sakaoduen Dejrat|| Rajadamnern Stadium || Bangkok, Thailand || Decision || 5||3:00
|-  bgcolor="#fbb"
| 1995- || Loss ||align=left|  Saenkeng Pinsinchai  || || France || Decision || 5||3:00
|-  bgcolor="#cfc"
| 1995-06 || Win ||align=left| Christian Garros ||  || France || Decision  || 5||3:00 
|-
! style=background:white colspan=9 |
|-  bgcolor="#cfc"
| 1995-02-18 || Win ||align=left| Yaaine Benhadj || Boxe thai || Paris, France || Decision  || 5||3:00
|-  bgcolor="#cfc"
| 1994-12-05 || Win ||align=left|  Sansing Muangsurin  || King's Birthday || Chiang Rai, Thailand || KO   || 4 ||
|-  bgcolor="#cfc"
| 1992- || Win ||align=left| Philippe Sapan  ||  || Aubervilliers, France || Decision  || 5||3:00 
|-
| colspan=9 | Legend:

References

1973 births
Flyweight kickboxers
Bantamweight kickboxers
Featherweight kickboxers
French Muay Thai practitioners
Muay Thai trainers
French male kickboxers
Algerian male kickboxers
Sportspeople from Hauts-de-Seine
French sportspeople of Algerian descent
Living people